This is a list of bridges in Guangdong, China.

List

Chancheng Dongping Bridge
Dongguan Shuidao
Dongpingshuidao Bridge
Guangzhou Bridge
Haiyin Bridge
Haizhu Bridge
Hedong Bridge
Huanan Bridge
Huangpu Bridge
Humen Pearl River Bridge
Jiangwan Bridge
Jiefang Bridge
Jinma Bridge
Liede Bridge
Nanhai Sanshanxi Bridge
Panyu Bridge
Pazhou Bridge
Pingsheng Bridge
Qi'ao Bridge
Queshi Bridge
Renmin Bridge
Shantou Bay Bridge
Xilong Bridge
Xinguang Bridge
Yajisha Bridge
Zhanjiang Bay Bridge
Zhaoqing Bridge under construction

See also
List of bridges in China

References

!
Guangdong